Palazzo Della Rovere is a palace in Rome, Italy, facing Via della Conciliazione. It is also known as Palazzo dei Penitenzieri.

History
The construction of the palace was started in 1480 by cardinal Domenico della Rovere, a relative of Pope Sixtus IV della Rovere, perhaps under the design of the Florentine architect Baccio Pontelli. The palazzo was built between 1480 and 1490 on the south side of Piazza Scossacavalli, destroyed in 1937 together with the spina di Borgo; Pontelli modelled it closely on  the architectural style of Palazzo Venezia, the most important building in 15th century Rome.  Five halls of the piano nobile, with important frescoes and ceilings, are now the official reception rooms of the Equestrian Order of the Holy Sepulchre of Jerusalem.

The current name was added during the reign of pope Alexander VII, who moved here the confessors working in Saint Peter's Basilica, known as penitenzieri. It formerly housed the Hotel Columbus and it is still the headquarters of the Order of the Holy Sepulchre.

Description
The building has a massive façade, inspired by that of Palazzo Venezia, with a tower on the northeast corner. The name of Domenico della Rovere is written on the windows of the first floor, while the coat of arms on the façade is that of Pope Clement XIV.

The interior has a court on two levels: a lower one with a portico featuring octagonal pillars and a pit, and an upper one with gardens. The palace has a rich internal decoration, the main rooms frescoed with fictive architecture. Part of the external painting, also representing fictive architecture, has survived. The most notable feature is the Semi-Gods Ceiling, a gallery of mythological and allegorical figures painted by Pinturicchio around 1490.

Sources

Buildings and structures completed in 1490
Houses completed in the 15th century
Palaces in Rome
Renaissance architecture in Rome
Rome R. XIV Borgo
Order of the Holy Sepulchre